The International Olympic Committee and Israel Swim Association recognise the fastest performances in pool-based swimming events at the Maccabiah Games.

Races are held in four swimming strokes: freestyle, backstroke, breaststroke and butterfly, over varying distances and in either individual or relay race events.  In the 2009 Maccabiah Games, both men and women competed in sixteen events in the pool, each sex in the same events with the exceptions of the 800 m freestyle (women-only) and the 1500 m freestyle (men-only). Maccabiah records were broken on a total of 21 occasions, eventually leaving just eleven outstanding from earlier Games. Of the 32 pool-based events,  all records belong to just two countries  the United States with eighteen and Israel with fifteen.

Men's records
Statistics are correct as of the end of the 2022 Maccabiah Games in Israel and include only those events which are currently recognised by the IOC as Olympic events.

Women's records
Statistics are correct as of the end of the 2022 Maccabiah Games in Israel and include only those events which are currently recognised by the IOC as Olympic events.

References

Swimming
Swimming at the Maccabiah Games
Maccabiah